La'uf al HaMillion is an Israeli game show hosted by Yaron Brovinsky. It has been broadcast on Channel 10 since December 2010. The show's format was specially developed for Channel 10 by July August Productions.

The show was sold for production in Spain through Israeli distributor Armoza Formats, where it was a success and is still airing, and was also sold to NBC (US) and Sat.1 (Germany). It was later sold to France, China, Hong Kong, Hungary, Brazil, Turkey,  Italy, Panama, Thailand, Uruguay, Vietnam and Greece and has aired over 4,000 episodes globally (Jan 2017).

Objective 
Each round, there's a main contestant, who competes with ten other contestants in trivia questions. The main contestant's goal is to beat as many contestants in a head-to-head match. If the main contestant succeeds in knocking out all ten, they win 1,000,000 NIS.

International versions
Legend: 
 Currently airing  
 No longer airing
 Upcoming season

References

External links
 Still Standing by Armoza Formats
 Still Standing Brochure

Israeli game shows
2010 Israeli television series debuts
2010s game shows